is a Japanese professional golfer. She is one of the leading players on the LPGA of Japan Tour and was in the top twenty of the February 2006 debut edition of the Women's World Golf Rankings. She finished T-11 at the LPGA Final Qualifying Tournament to earn her tour card for 2015.

Yokomine has endorsement deals with Epson, Srixon, Asahi Soft Drinks, Le Coq Sportif, ANA and Sato.

Professional wins

LPGA of Japan Tour (23)

Tournaments in bold denotes major tournaments in LPGA of Japan Tour.

Ladies Asian Golf Tour

Other
2006 Hitachi 3Tours Championship (with Shin Hyun-Ju, Wei Yun-Jye, Ai Miyazato, Akane Iijima)

Results in LPGA majors
Results not in chronological order before 2019.

^ The Evian Championship was added as a major in 2013.

CUT = missed the half-way cut
T = tied

Summary

Most consecutive cuts made – 9 (2008 ANA – 2011 U.S. Open)
Longest streak of top-10s – 1 (twice)

Team appearances
Professional
Lexus Cup (representing Asia team): 2006 (winners)
World Cup (representing Japan): 2006
International Crown (representing Japan): 2014

References

External links
 

Japanese female golfers
LPGA of Japan Tour golfers
LPGA Tour golfers
Asian Games medalists in golf
Asian Games silver medalists for Japan
Golfers at the 2002 Asian Games
Medalists at the 2002 Asian Games
Sportspeople from Kagoshima Prefecture
People from Kanoya, Kagoshima
1985 births
Living people